Pattabiram railway station is one of the railway stations of the Chennai Central–Arakkonam section of the Chennai Suburban Railway Network. Located about 25 km from Chennai Central railway station, it is a suburb situated on the western part of Chennai (formerly known as Madras), India. the station serves the neighbourhoods of Pattabiram. It has an elevation of 31 m above sea level.

History
The lines at the station were electrified on 29 November 1979, with the electrification of the Chennai Central–Tiruvallur section.

Commuter facilities
Around 16,000 commuters use the station every day. In 2002, the railway department allotted  12 million for improving passenger amenities at the Pattabiram and Puliamangalam stations. A bridge connecting north bazaar with south bazaar over level crossing 10 at the Tiruvallur end of the railway station was inaugurated in 2010 and has a fleet of steps on either end for commuters to access the bridge. The bridge caters to about 50 villages with a population of over 60,000. The residents are demanding that a road overbridge be built to replace the other level crossing.

See also

 Chennai Suburban Railway
 Railway stations in Chennai

References

External links
 Pattabiram railway station at Indiarailinfo.com

Stations of Chennai Suburban Railway
Railway stations in Chennai
Railway stations in Tiruvallur district